Bely (masculine), Belaya (feminine), or Beloye (neuter), literally meaning "white", is the name of several inhabited localities in Russia.

Urban localities
Bely, Tver Oblast, a town in Tver Oblast

Rural localities
Bely, Krasnodar Krai, a khutor in Temryuksky District of Krasnodar Krai
Bely, Oryol Oblast, a khutor in Kolpnyansky District of Oryol Oblast
Belaya, Kostroma Oblast, a village in Pyshchugsky District of Kostroma Oblast
Belaya, Moscow Oblast, a village in Noginsky District of Moscow Oblast
Belaya, name of several other rural localities
Beloye, Republic of Adygea, a selo in Krasnogvardeysky District of the Republic of Adygea
Beloye, Kursk Oblast, a selo in Oboyansky District of Kursk Oblast
Beloye, name of several other rural localities